Isabelle Barratt-Delia (née Gulia; born 1938) is the first recorded female Maltese architect of the 20th century.

Early life and education 
Barratt-Delia was born in Malta in 1938. She was educated at the Convent of the Sacred Heart, St Julian's. In 1961, she graduated as an architect and civil engineer from the Royal University of Malta in Valletta, now known as the University of Malta.

Career 
Barratt-Delia worked at Mortimer and de Giorgio Architects for a short period of time, before leaving for Canada. She worked for the Canadian Exhibition Commission between 1962 and 1964 and participated in fairs in New York City, Milan, Frankfurt and Sydney.

Personal life 
Barratt-Delia met Peter Barratt, an architect and urban planner, while working at Mortimer and de Giorgio Architects. They married in 1961 and moved to Canada.

References 

1938 births
20th-century Maltese architects
Women architects
Maltese emigrants to Canada
Living people